Almonte Douglas Alkenbrack (June 2, 1912 – March 19, 1998) was a Canadian politician and a lumberman. He was born in Rydal Bank, Ontario, which is now a part of the township of Plummer Additional, Ontario.

He was elected in 1962 as a Member of the House of Commons of Canada for the riding of Prince Edward—Lennox, Ontario representing the Progressive Conservative Party. He was re-elected in the 1963 election then in the 1965 election in the same riding and re-elected in the riding of Frontenac—Lennox and Addington, Ontario in 1968, 1972 and then in 1974. He was also a member of various standing committees.

Prior to his federal career in politics, he was first elected as a councillor to Napanee, Ontario in 1952 where he eventually became mayor in 1957.

External links 
 

1912 births
1998 deaths
Members of the House of Commons of Canada from Ontario
Progressive Conservative Party of Canada MPs
People from Algoma District
Mayors of places in Ontario
People from Lennox and Addington County